Ljubibratić is a Serbo-Croatian surname, a patronymic derived from the masculine given name Ljubibrat. The family, or rather, brotherhood, descend from the Ljubibratić noble family active in the Trebinje and Konavle region between 1404 and 1432. It may refer to:

Mićo Ljubibratić (1839–1889), Herzegovinian rebel
Jeronim Ljubibratić (1716–1779), Habsburg military commander
Stefan Ljubibratić (fl. 1687–1718), Metropolitan of Zahumlje and Dalmatia
Savatije Ljubibratić (fl. 1687–1716), Metropolitan of Zahumlje and Dalmatia
Damjan Ljubibratić (fl. 1596–1614), Serbian Orthodox monk and diplomat
Radoslav Ljubibratić (fl. 1404), Bosnian nobleman

See also
Ljubobratić

Serbian surnames